Estadio José Dellagiovanna (popularly knwon as the Coliseo de Victoria) is a stadium in Victoria, Buenos Aires, Argentina. It is the home venue of Club Atlético Tigre and was inaugurated in 1936. The stadium has a current capacity of 26,282 people.

The stadium also features a lighting system consisting of 4 towers with 13 spotlights each (2000 w) and 18 press booths. Its name honors José Dellagiovanna, former player and first president of C.A. Tigre, since 2009.

History 

Prior to the construction of its own venue, Tigre played their home matches at neighbor Club San Fernando stadium. In December 1913 the club moved to a field on Rocha and Río de las Conchas in Rincón de Milberg district of Tigre Partido. That venue was popularly known as Lechero Ahogado ("drowned milkman") due to an urban legend based on the frequent river floodings. The nickname was atributed to Uruguayan journalist Alfredo Palacio.

In February 1932 the stadium featured new grandstands, expanding its capacity. Nevertheless, its location made it difficult for spectators to access. In December 1935, Tigre acquired a more accessible land on Guido and Spano streets in the neighboring town of Victoria (5 km to the southeast). There the club began to build a new stadium, which was inaugurated on 20 September 1936 in a friendly match v Boca Juniors, won by the Zeneixes 4–1.

New wooden grandstands (25 x 4 mt each) were added to one of the end sides on 11 de Septiembre Avenue in 1940. Two years later, a wooden stand was placed on another side. Concrete grandstands were first put in 1955, but the total of wooden structures would not been replaced until 2006.

The stadium did not have a name, being known as "Monumental de Victoria". In 2009 members of the club's executive committee voted for a name. José Dellagiovanna, who was not only Tigre's first president but player, treasurer, and manager of the club, won by 61%. Other names voted were Juan Marvezzi (all-time top scorer), and legendary Bernabé Ferreyra, among others.

Events 
Juan Perón was named Honorary President of the club in 1944. Raúl Alfonsín gave a speech at the stadium in 1983, prior to the general election that proclaimed him as president of Argentina. The club also hosted some concerts such as Pappo (1991), Damas Gratis (2019), Ratones Paranoicos, Los Nocheros, and Horacio Guarany.

Gallery

Notes

References

Club Atlético Tigre
j
1936 establishments in Argentina